António Pedro Pina Gomes (born 29 August 2000 in Portugal) is a Portuguese footballer.

Career

Gomes started his career with Italian Serie A side Atalanta B.C. after playing for the youth academy of Rodange 91 in Luxembourg.

In 2019, he signed for Italian second division team Delfino Pescara 1936.

In 2020, Gomes signed for U.D. Oliveirense in the Portuguese second division.

References

External links
 Antόnio Gomes at ForaDeJogo.net

Portuguese footballers
Association football wingers
Living people
2000 births
Portugal youth international footballers
U.D. Oliveirense players